The Parents' Choice Award was an award presented by the non-profit Parents' Choice Foundation to recognize "the very best products for children of different ages and backgrounds, and of varied skill and interest levels." It was considered a "prestigious" award among children's products, and had been described by the Cincinnati Enquirer as the industry equivalent of an Academy Award.

The Parents' Choice Awards were established in 1978 by Diana Huss Green, who was then the president of the Parents' Choice Foundation. The award recipients were determined by a committee of educators, scientists, performing artists, librarians, parents and children. One of six award commendations were given to award winners: Classic, Gold, Silver, Recommended, Approved or "Fun Stuff." The awards were held annually. The Parents' Choice Foundation closed in 2022.

References

External links
Parents' Choice Foundation 

American children's literary awards
Children's media and toys awards
Game awards
Awards established in 1978
1978 establishments in the United States